The 2014 Hawaii gubernatorial election took place on November 4, 2014, to elect the Governor of Hawaii, concurrently with a special election to Hawaii's Class III Senate Seat, as well as other elections to the United States Senate in other states and elections to the United States House of Representatives and various state and local elections.

Primary elections were held on August 9, 2014. In Hawaii, candidates for governor and lieutenant governor run in separate primaries and are then elected on the same ticket. Incumbent Democratic governor Neil Abercrombie ran for re-election to a second term in office, but was defeated by State Senator David Ige in the Democratic primary, making Abercrombie the first incumbent governor to lose renomination in Hawaii history. Incumbent Democratic lieutenant governor Shan Tsutsui was renominated.

The Republicans nominated former lieutenant governor Duke Aiona and pastor and former circuit court judge Elwin Ahu. Also running as an independent was former mayor of Honolulu Mufi Hannemann and former Honolulu parks and recreation director Les Chang. Ige and Tsutsui won the election.

Democratic primary

Governor

Candidates

Declared
 Neil Abercrombie, incumbent governor
 David Ige, state senator
 Van K. Tanabe, candidate for governor in 2010

Declined
 Ed Case, former U.S. Representative and candidate for the U.S. Senate in 2006 and 2012

Endorsements

Debates
Complete video of debate, July 4, 2014 - YouTube

Polling

 * Internal poll for Neil Abercrombie campaign

Results

Lieutenant governor
Brian Schatz won the Democratic primary for lieutenant governor in 2010 with 37% of the vote and was elected alongside Abercrombie. After the death of U.S. Senator Daniel Inouye in December 2012, Abercrombie appointed Schatz to succeed him in the Senate. Schatz resigned as lieutenant governor and was succeeded by Shan Tsutsui, the president of the Hawaii Senate.

Candidates

Declared
 Clayton Hee, state senator, candidate for lieutenant governor in 2002 and candidate for Hawaii's 2nd congressional district in 2006
 Shan Tsutsui, incumbent lieutenant governor

Results

Republican primary

Governor

Candidates

Declared
 Duke Aiona, former lieutenant governor and nominee for governor in 2010

Declined
 Charles Djou, former U.S. Representative (running for HI-01)
 Mufi Hannemann, Democratic former mayor of Honolulu, candidate for governor in 2010 and candidate for HI-02 in 2012 (running as an Independent)

Endorsements

Results

Lieutenant governor

Candidates

Declared
 Elwin Ahu, pastor and former circuit court judge
Warner "Kimo" Sutton, businessman

Declined
 David Chang, former chairman of the Hawaii Republican Party

Results

Libertarian nomination

Governor

Candidates

Declared
 Jeff Davis, solar contractor and radio show host

Results

Lieutenant governor

Candidates

Declared
 Cynthia (Lahi) Marlin

Results

Hawaii Independent primary

Governor

Candidates

Declared
 Mufi Hannemann, Democratic former mayor of Honolulu, candidate for governor in 2010 and candidate for Hawaii's 2nd congressional district in 2012

Results

Lieutenant governor

Candidates

Declared
 Running mate: Les Chang, former Honolulu parks and recreation director

Results

No Party primary
Hawaii has strict criteria for independent candidates seeking to participate in the general election. Three of the four candidates were disqualified for not having a running mate. The other candidate also had no running mate, but had already withdrawn from the race. They all still appeared on the ballot, alongside a notice about their status.

Candidates

Disqualified
 Misty Davis
 Khis Dejean Caldwell
 Richard Morse

Withdrew
 Joe Spatola

Results

General election

Debates
Complete video of debate, September 26, 2014 - YouTube
Complete video of debate, October 9, 2014 - YouTube
Complete video of debate, October 15, 2014 - C-SPAN

Predictions

Polling

Results

References

External links
 Hawaii gubernatorial election, 2014 at Ballotpedia

Official campaign websites (Archived)
Neil Abercrombie
Duke Aiona

Mufi Hannemann
David Ige

Gubernatorial
2014
Hawaii